Statistics of the Scottish Football League in season 1993–94.

Scottish Premier Division

Scottish First Division

Scottish Second Division

See also
1993–94 in Scottish football

References

 
Scottish Football League seasons